Sinnamon was an American female R&B vocal trio from 1982 to 1994.

Sinnamon may also refer to:

Places
Sinnamon Park, Queensland, suburb of Brisbane, Queensland, Australia
Sinnamon Farm, heritage-listed farm in Sinnamon Park

People
Ryan Sinnamon (born 1996), Scottish football (soccer) player 
Shandi Sinnamon (born 1952), American singer and songwriter

See also
Cinnamon (disambiguation)